Pycnocarpon is a genus of fungi in the class Dothideomycetes and in the Asterinaceae family.

The relationship of this taxon to other taxa within the class is unknown (incertae sedis).

See also
 List of Dothideomycetes genera incertae sedis

References

External links
 Pycnocarpon at Index Fungorum

Dothideomycetes enigmatic taxa
Dothideomycetes genera